Parco Adriano is a park in Milan, Italy.  It contains many modern high-rise residential blocks, built between 2004 and 2007, covering an area of 120,000 m2, overlooked by architect Franco Giorgetta.

References

External links
Official site

Parks in Milan
Buildings and structures completed in 2007